Eileen Beasley (4 April 1921 – 12 August 2012) was a Welsh teacher who, along with her husband Trefor, conducted a campaign of civil disobedience in the 1950s against the Rural District Council of Llanelli in a demand for council rate bills in the Welsh language. Her stand has led Welsh language campaigners to describe her as the "mother of direct action" and her protest helped to lead to the creation of Cymdeithas yr Iaith Gymraeg.

Early life
Catherine Eileen James was born in 1921, the younger of two children. She attended University College Cardiff and became a teacher. She met Trefor Beasley at Plaid Cymru gatherings and they were married on 31 July 1951. The couple moved to Llangennech near Llanelli in 1952.

Welsh language campaign
Eileen and her husband Trefor became leading campaigners in the right to use Welsh in the 1950s, as at that time the Welsh language had no official status in Wales: no forms by public bodies were issued in the Welsh language and there were few bilingual road signs. The Beasleys refused to pay their tax bills until they were written in Welsh, as at the time they were written only in English. This refusal led to the couple being taken to court 16 times over the course of eight years, along with many personal belongings being taken by bailiffs. Trefor spent a week in prison. After numerous court appearances the couple won their battle in 1960, at which point Llanelli district council agreed to print tax bills bilingually in Welsh and English. Both Eileen and Trefor were elected as local councillors in 1955 for Plaid Cymru on Llanelli district council. Eileen Beasley is known as the "mother of direct action" in Wales and the "Rosa Parks of Wales". In April 2015 Llanelli Community Heritage unveiled a commemorative Blue Plaque at the Beasley Family home in Llangennech.

Creation of Cymdeithas yr Iaith Gymraeg
In 1962 Saunders Lewis, a prominent Welsh nationalist and a founder of Plaid Cymru, gave a radio speech entitled Tynged yr iaith (The Fate of the Language) in which he predicted the extinction of the Welsh language unless action was taken. This speech led to the creation of Cymdeithas yr Iaith Gymraeg (the Welsh Language Society). During this speech he directly praised the actions of Trefor and Eileen Beasley for their campaign for Welsh language tax bills.

Lewis took the Beasley case as a model for future action, but significantly added "this cannot be done reasonably except in those districts where Welsh-speakers are a substantial proportion of the population". He proposed to make it impossible for the business of local and central government to continue without using Welsh". "It is a policy for a movement", he said, "in the areas where Welsh is a spoken language in daily use" it would be "nothing less than a revolution".

Death
Eileen Beasley died on 12 August 2012 of pancreatic cancer. Language campaigners have said that Eileen and Trefor's courage inspired a generation to take up the fight and led to crucial milestones in the protection of the Welsh language, such as the creation of S4C (Sianel Pedwar Cymru - Channel Four Wales) and bilingual road signs.

References

Bibliography

1921 births
2012 deaths
Alumni of Cardiff University
Deaths from cancer in Wales
Councillors in Wales
Deaths from pancreatic cancer
Plaid Cymru politicians
Welsh language activists
Welsh schoolteachers
People from Carmarthenshire
Women councillors in Wales